Adam Jahn (born January 5, 1991) is an American former soccer player who plays as a forward.

Career

Early and collegiate
The son of Tom and Barbara, Jahn attended Jesuit High School in Carmichael, California, where he played soccer. He was named the  Gatorade California Player of the Year in 2007 and 2008, in addition to being named a NSCAA All-American. He continued his education and soccer career at Stanford University, where he played all four years, scoring 24 goals and 12 assists. In his senior year, he was named to the All-Pac-12 first team.

Adam played his youth club soccer at the Davis Legacy Soccer Club from 2000 through 2008.

San Jose Earthquakes
Jahn was selected as the 15th pick in the 2013 MLS Supplemental Draft by his local team, the San Jose Earthquakes, on January 22, 2013. On March 3, 2013, Jahn made his debut for the Earthquakes at Buck Shaw Stadium in the opening game of the season by coming on as a substitute in the 83rd minute for Ty Harden. San Jose lost the match 2–0 against Real Salt Lake.  He scored his first professional goal in his next game against the New York Red Bulls.  The goal came in the form of a right-footed volley off a far-post cross from Sam Cronin in the 83rd minute to tie the game. On a subsequent play, he headed the ball into the hand of Roy Miller, setting up the winning penalty kick by Chris Wondolowski to complete a 2–1 comeback victory.

Columbus Crew SC
On July 30, 2016, Jahn was traded to Columbus Crew SC in exchange for Targeted Allocation Money. He made his club debut the next day, coming on as a substitute in a 3-0 loss to Toronto FC. Jahn scored his first Crew SC goal in a 2-1 loss to the Philadelphia Union, after coming on as a substitute with 30 minutes to play.

At the end of the 2018 season, the club declined Jahn's contract option; he departed Columbus with seven goals from 46 total appearances.

Phoenix Rising FC
Jahn signed with Phoenix Rising FC on December 10, 2018. Jahn scored 17 goals, which was 5th in the league, and added 5 assists.

Atlanta United FC
On January 22, 2020, Jahn was acquired by Atlanta United. The transfer fee was undisclosed, but it was reportedly $100,000. Jahn was waived by Atlanta on February 2, 2021.

Orange County SC
On February 22, 2021, Jahn joined USL Championship side Orange County SC, technically on loan from Atlanta United, although he had recently been waived by the MLS club.

Career statistics

Honors
Sacramento Republic
USL Cup: 2014

Phoenix Rising
USL Championship Regular Season Title: 2019

Orange County SC
USL Cup: 2021

Individual
USL Championship All League First Team: 2019

References

External links
 Stanford profile
 
 

1991 births
Living people
American soccer players
Stanford Cardinal men's soccer players
Washington Crossfire players
San Jose Earthquakes players
Sacramento Republic FC players
Columbus Crew players
OKC Energy FC players
Phoenix Rising FC players
Atlanta United FC players
Orange County SC players
Association football forwards
People from Davis, California
Soccer players from California
Sportspeople from Greater Sacramento
Sportspeople from Sacramento County, California
San Jose Earthquakes draft picks
USL League Two players
Major League Soccer players
USL Championship players
United States men's youth international soccer players
People from Carmichael, California